When My Love Blooms is a 2020 South Korean television series starring Yoo Ji-tae, Lee Bo-young, Park Jinyoung, and Jeon So-nee. It aired on tvN every Saturday and Sunday at 21:00 (KST) time slot from April 25 to June 14, 2020.

Synopsis
Han Jae-hyun (Yoo Ji-tae) and Yoon Ji-soo (Lee Bo-young) met and fell in love when they were university students. Twenty years later, they cross paths once again: Jae-hyun has become a successful businessman who pursues wealth and honor, while Ji-soo is a mother and a contract worker living a difficult life.

Cast

Main
 Yoo Ji-tae as Han Jae-hyun
 Park Jin-young as young Jae-hyun
 The Vice-President of Hyung Sung Corporation. He is seen as a labor union turncoat when in actuality, he joined Hyung Song Corporation to take revenge on those who betrayed and framed his father for illegal dissolution of labor unions that eventually led to his suicide.
 Lee Bo-young as Yoon Ji-soo
 Jeon So-nee as young Ji-soo

Supporting

People around Ji-soo
 Jang Gwang as Yoon Hyung-gyu
 He is Ji-soo's father and a former Chief Prosecutor of the Seoul Central District Prosecutor's Office. He was fired from his job after admitting to abusing his power and taking bribes. 
 Lee Jong-nam as Jung Sook-hee
 Ji-soo's mother. She died after the department store she was in collapsed. She was in the department store with Ji-young to buy a gift and cake for Ji-soo's birthday.
 Chae Won-bin as Yoon Ji-young
 Ji-soo's sister. She died with her mother.
 Go Woo-rim as Lee Young-min
 Ji-soo's son. He attends an international school on a scholarship but left on his own accord. He finds custody under his mother more comfortable than his father's.

People around Jae-hyun
 Moon Sung-keun as Jang San, Jae-hyun's father in law
 Park Si-yeon as Jang Seo-kyung, Jae-hyun's estranged wife
 Park Min-soo as Han Joon-seo, Jae-hyun's son who bullies Ji'soo's son
 Kang Young-suk as Kang Joon-woo
 Kim Ho-chang as Jung Yoon-gi
 Nam Myung-ryul as Han In-ho, Jae-hyun's father
 Son Sook as Lee Kyung-ja, Jae-hyun's mother

Others
 Woo Jung-won as Yang Hye-jung
 Park Han-sol as young Hye-jung
 Lee Tae-sung as Joo Young-woo
 Byung Hun as young Young-woo
 Min Sung-wook as Lee Dong-jin
 Eun Hae-sung as young Dong-jin
 Kim Joo-ryoung as Sung Hwa-jin
 Han Ji-won as young Hwa-jin
 Kim Young-hoon as Lee Se-hoon, Ji-soo's ex-husband
 Choi Woo-hyuk as Se-hwi, Seo-kyung's lover
 Kim Young-ah as Choi Sun-hee

Original soundtrack

Part 1

Part 2

Part 3

Part 4

Part 5

Part 6

Part 7

Part 8

Part 9

Part 10

Part 11

Part 12

Part 13

Viewership

References

External links
  
 
 

TVN (South Korean TV channel) television dramas
Korean-language television shows
2020 South Korean television series debuts
2020 South Korean television series endings
South Korean romance television series
South Korean melodrama television series
Television series by Studio Dragon
Television series by Bon Factory Worldwide